Olho d'Água is a municipality in the state of Paraíba in the Northeast Region of Brazil.

Demographics
According to the 2020 IBGE statistics, 6,462 people live in this municipality.

Attractions
In the Recanto Ecológico Rio da Prata wildlife park, the Olho D'Água river gets flooded every seven years, submerging the local hiking trails. This has become an attractive venue for divers.

See also
List of municipalities in Paraíba

References

Municipalities in Paraíba